Dafna, is a feminine given name. Notable people with the given name include:

Dafna Dekel, Israeli singer and actress
Dafna Kaffeman, Israeli artist
Dafna Lemish, Israeli-American media researcher
Dafna Linzer, journalist
Dafna Rechter, Israeli actress and singer

Hebrew feminine given names